KSOY-LD is a digital Class A low-power television station that is licensed to and located in McAllen, Texas, United States. The station is an independent station owned by Eduardo S. Gallegos. Over-the-air, it broadcasts its digital signal over UHF channel 44 (virtual channel 69 via PSIP) from a transmitter site south of La Feria.

History
On September 23, 1997, the FCC granted Deanna Hinojosa Ortiz a construction permit for channel 69 in McAllen. The unbuilt station was sold to the Harlingen-based Faith Pleases God Corporation in 1999 and finally came to air by September 2000.

In 2010, Faith Pleases God sold KSTI-LP to JIL Production Group, owned by José Ignacio Larraga. The station changed its call letters to KNUC-LP after the sale and relocated its antenna. JIL also had to wrestle with the removal of channel 69 from broadcast use; the station moved to digital on channel 44 under special temporary authority in December 2011.

Eduardo S. Gallegos, the president of Grupo Radio Avanzado in Matamoros, bought KNUC-LP in 2012 for $600,000. The station then was silent for almost a year, from June 20, 2013, to June 18, 2014. It reemerged as KSOY-LD in 2014. The station was further displaced to channel 34 by the removal of 600 MHz from broadcast use.

In August 2018, the 69.1 main subchannel was relaunched as Central TV, with new studios being built at Grupo Radio Avanzado's Matamoros facility. The Central TV main channel includes two Radio Avanzado-produced newscasts.

Digital channels
The station's digital signal is multiplexed in the following manner.

References

External links
Central TV on Facebook

Low-power television stations in the United States
SOY-LD
Television channels and stations established in 2000